Aspergillus stromatoides is a species of fungus in the genus Aspergillus. Aspergillus stromatoides produces Calmodulin inhibitors. Many of the strains of Aspergillus stromatoides have been isolated in Thailand.

References

Further reading 
 

 

stromatoides
Fungi described in 1965